The 1951 Census of India was the ninth in a series of censuses held in India every decade since 1872. It was also the first census after independence and Partition of India. 1951 census was also the first census to be conducted under 1948 Census of India Act. The first census of  the Indian Republic began on February 10, 1951.

The population of India was counted as 361,088,090 (1000:946 male:female) Total population increased by 42,427,510, 13.31% more than the 318,660,580 people counted during the 1941 census. No census was done for Jammu and Kashmir in 1951 and its figures were interpolated from 1941 and 1961 state census. National Register of Citizens for Assam (NRC) was prepared soon after the census. In 1951, at the time of the first population Census, just 18% of Indians were literate while life expectancy was 32 years.  Based on 1951 census of displaced persons, 7,226,000 Muslims went to Pakistan (both West and East Pakistan
) from India, while 7,249,000 Hindus and Sikhs moved to India from Pakistan (both West and East Pakistan).

Language demographics

Separate figures for Hindi, Urdu, and Punjabi were not issued , due to the partition 1947 and fact the returns were intentionally recorded incorrect in states such as East Punjab, Himachal Pradesh, Delhi, PEPSU, and Bilaspur.

Religious demographics
Hindus comprised 305 million (84.1%), Sikhs were 6.86 million (1.9%) and Muslims were 35.4 million (9.8%) in the 1951 census.
1951 Indian census showed that there were 8.3 million Christians. Hindus comprised about 73 per cent of the population of India before partition and  just after independence, Independent India in (1947) have roughly around 85 per cent Hindus.

See also

 Census of India prior to independence
 1891 Census of India
 Demographics of India

Notes

References

Further reading

External links
 
 Census Reports – 1951, South Asia Open Archives, JSTOR.
 Census of India, 1951, Volume 1, Part 1-A – Report, Registrar General, India and ex-officio Census Commissioner for India, via archive.org.

Political history of India
Censuses in India
1951 in India
India